Murder in Hawaii constitutes the intentional killing, under circumstances defined by law, of people within or under the jurisdiction of the U.S. state of Hawaii.

The United States Centers for Disease Control and Prevention reported that in the year 2020, the state had a murder rate well below the median for the entire country.

Elements
A first-degree murder involves one or more specific elements:

 Multiple victims killed
 A public safety official, such as a police officer, firefighter, or paramedic/EMT
 A judge or prosecutor killed (in connection with their respective duties)
 A witness in a criminal case killed (in connection with the person being a witness)
 Murder committed for hire (with the charge applying to both the murderer and the person who paid the murderer)
 Murder committed by an imprisoned person
 Murder committed under organized crime (refer to RICO act)

Felony murder rule

In Hawaii, the common law felony murder rule has been completely abolished. In Hawaii Revised Statutes §707-701, the Hawaii State Legislature noted the critical history of the felony murder rule and the severe limitation of it in the Model Penal Code.  The legislature determined that the commission of a felony should not serve to automatically classify an offense as murder, and that a separate factual inquiry should be undertaken for each case to determine the significance of a felony on the severity of the offense.

Penalties
The state of Hawaii has no death penalty. If they are found guilty, the maximum penalty is life imprisonment without the possibility of parole.

References

External links
Full Text of HRS §707-701

Murder in the United States